Bailey Magnet High School, originally known as Bailey Junior High School and now Bailey APAC Middle School, is a middle school in Jackson, Mississippi, United States.
The mascot of Bailey Magnet Middle School is the Mighty Knights.

Architecture
Built in 1938, Bailey Magnet's art-deco building has been marveled as an architectural wonder. In 2007, it was voted as a top architectural site by the state chapter of the American Institute of Architects. According to The Washington Post, its architect, A. Hays Town, while employed at N.W. Overstreet designed the building.

It was rumored to have made the cover of a 1938 Life magazine for the school's forward look and his revolutionary technique of formed-in-place concrete, but there was an article about it in Life. The article mentioned the marvel lying "in the details" which include "carved stone reliefs of Andrew Jackson, the namesake of the city of Jackson with his troops and Chief Pushmataha with his braves, allies in the Indian wars," at the front footsteps of the building. The halls are terrazzoed and the great auditorium has "ornate columns and a stylized horse-and-rider sculpture."

Conversion to Bailey APAC (2012)
Bailey Magnet High School is now Bailey APAC Middle School due to Jackson Public Schools district-wide rezoning in 2012 serving children in grades 6-8 for the Academic & Performing Arts Complex (APAC). The district rezoning was for a number of reasons such as turning Northwest Middle School into an all IB (International Baccluareate) school and moving all Montessori students into McWillie elementary. The rezoning affected 3,900 students. APAC, which was served at Chastain, Peeples, and Powell middle schools, moved into Bailey and the high school students moved to Callaway High School, Lanier High School and Murrah High School. Bailey Magnet formerly had a Health-Related Professions program that is currently at Murrah High.

Academic & Performing Arts Complex (APAC)
Academic & Performing Arts Complex (APAC) is open to students who are strong academic achievers and/or who show aptitude for one or more visual or performing arts. There is an application process held each year for entrance into the following school year.

Academics: Eligibility for the academics division is based on grades, standardized tests, entrance tests, and teacher recommendations. Cooperative learning and higher order thinking skills are emphasized. Courses in math, science, language arts and social studies prepare students to take college coursework (Advanced Placement). APAC academic courses are offered for grades 4-5 at Power APAC Elementary; grades 6-8 at Bailey APAC Middle School, and for grades 9-12 at Murrah High School. In October 2002, Jackson Public Schools received a federal grant totaling almost 1 million dollars to increase the number of middle and high school students who complete college-level courses in high school. APAC students use textbooks, skills, and materials above their grade level.
Performing Arts: The performing arts division offers classes in dance, music, theatre arts and visual arts. Students must apply and audition for entry into the program. These courses are offered for grades 4 through 12 are at the Power APAC site. This division of APAC is based on a rigorous written, sequential curriculum taught by artist teachers. Artistically, the objective is to prepare students for the next level in the arts whether university, apprenticeship, or professional experience.

APAC Language Arts
In APAC Language Arts courses for grades 6-8, students actively engage in the integrated language strands of reading, writing, speaking, and listening. Students work on skills, textbooks and materials that are a grade level ahead of the on-level curriculum, including reading multiple novels and writing frequently. Emphasis is placed on using Standard English in speaking and writing, and on critical analysis of literature across the genres.

Language Arts, Grade 6 APAC
Language Arts, Grade 7 APAC
Language Arts, Grade 8 APAC

APAC Math
In APAC Math courses grades 6-7, students study all objectives identified for their grade level along with matching, extended objectives from Pre-Algebra and Transition to Algebra, so that they are prepared for Algebra I by grade 8. Students use skills, textbooks, and materials that are ahead of the on-level curriculum. Emphasis is placed on problem solving from daily life and on building a strong foundation of basic computational skills that will be used throughout higher level math courses.

Pre-Algebra, Grade 6 APAC
Algebra Transition, Grade 7 APAC
Algebra I, Grade 8 APAC

APAC Science
In APAC Science courses for grades 6-8, students actively engage in the integrated science strands of earth, physical and life sciences. Students work on skills, textbooks, and materials that are a grade level above the on-level curriculum, including reading additional texts and completing a science project each year. Emphasis is placed on building a foundation of strong content knowledge, along with scientific inquiry and critical thinking.

Science, Grade 6 APAC
Science, Grade 7 APAC
Science, Grade 8 APAC

APAC Social Studies
In APAC Social Studies courses for grades 6-8, students actively engage in the social studies strands of geography, history, politics and economics. Students work on skills, textbooks and materials that are a grade level above the on-level curriculum, including reading historical fiction and primary documents, and completing research projects. Emphasis is placed on a building a foundation of strong content knowledge, with critical analysis and application of knowledge to the current world.

World Geography and Citizenship, Grade 6 APAC
World History from Pre-Historic Era to the Age of Enlightenment, Grade 7 APAC
U.S. History to 1877, Grade 8 APAC

Demographics
There were 523 students enrolled in Bailey Magnet High during the 2006-2007 school year. The gender makeup of the district was 56% female and 44% male. The racial makeup of the school was 97.90% African American, 0.76% White, 0.96% Hispanic, and 0.38% Asian.

References

External links
 Official website

Public high schools in Mississippi
Art Deco architecture in Mississippi
Schools in Jackson, Mississippi
Magnet schools in Mississippi